Philip Alexander Bell (1808–1889)  was a 19th-century  American newspaper editor and abolitionist. Born in New York City, he was educated at the African Free School and became politically active at the 1832 Colored Convention. He began his newspaper career with for William Lloyd Garrison's  anti-slavery newspaper The Liberator and became an outspoken voice on a variety of social and political of issues of the day including abolition, suffrage, and the protection of fugitive slaves.  

In 1837, he founded The Weekly Advocate newspaper, edited by Samuel Cornish. The paper was later renamed The Colored American and co-owned by Charles Bennett Ray. In 1860, he moved to San Francisco where he became co-editor of the African-American newspaper The Pacific Appeal. After the Civil War he founded and edited The San Francisco Elevator during the Reconstruction Era. 

Bell died on April 24, 1889.

See also
 List of African-American abolitionists

References

American male journalists
19th-century American journalists
African-American abolitionists
African-American journalists
1808 births
1889 deaths
Colored Conventions people